Grevillea molyneuxii, commonly known as Wingello grevillea, is a species of flowering plant in the family Proteaceae and is endemic to a restricted area of south-eastern New South Wales. It is a spreading shrub with narrowly oblong or narrowly elliptic to linear leaves and cylindrical clusters of reddish flowers.

Description
The upper surface of the leaves is smooth and the lower side is silky-hairy, sometimes hidden by the downturned edges of the leaves.

Taxonomy
Grevillea molyneuxii was first formally described in 1986 by Donald McGillivray in his book New Names in Grevillea (Proteaceae) from specimens collected near Wingello in 1973. The specific epithet (molyneuxii) honours the horticulturalist William Mitchell Molyneux.

Distribution and habitat
Wingello grevillea grows in moist heath and shrubland in a few sites near Penrose in south-eastern New South Wales.

Conservation status
Grevillea molyneuxii is listed as "endangered" under the Australian Government Environment Protection and Biodiversity Conservation Act 1999 and as "vulnerable" under the New South Wales Government Biodiversity Conservation Act 2016. The main threats to the species include its small population size and distribution, inappropriate fire regimes and digging by animals such as pigs.

References

molyneuxii
Proteales of Australia
Flora of New South Wales
Taxa named by Donald McGillivray
Plants described in 1986